Buittle Bridge, also known as Craignair Bridge is a bridge over the Urr Water just outside Dalbeattie in Dumfries and Galloway, Scotland. Completed in 1797, it replaced and earlier two-span bridge of the same name which was destroyed in a flood a short time after its completion; the remains of this older bridge, comprising the base of its pier and some remnants of its south-west abutment, survive a short distance upstream.

Unusually wide for a single-span stone bridge, its voussoirs, springers and soffit are made of ashlar, and its spandrels and parapet are of rubble. Historic Environment Scotland note that the masonry work on the bridge is unusually fine.

The bridge was designated a Category A listed building in 1989. It is still in use, carrying the A711 road south-west out of Dalbeattie towards Castle Douglas and Kirkcudbright, and spanning the boundary between the parishes of Haugh of Urr and Buittle.

References

Sources

Category A listed buildings in Dumfries and Galloway
18th-century establishments in Scotland
Bridges completed in 1797
Road bridges in Scotland